Oksana Vladimirovna Kushenko (born 18 February 1972) is a Russian freestyle skier. 

She won a gold medal in ski ballet at the FIS Freestyle World Ski Championships 1997, and a silver medal at the FIS Freestyle World Ski Championships 1999. She also competed at the 1991 and 1995 world championships.

References

External links 
 

1972 births
Living people
Russian female freestyle skiers